XEMAS-AM is a radio station on 1560 AM in Salamanca, Guanajuato, Mexico. Owned by Radio Grupo Antonio Contreras, XEMAS is known as La Estación Familiar with a ranchera music format.

History

XERX-AM received its concession on March 1, 1948. Ernesto Bravo Vargas owned the station until 1971, when it was acquired by Radio Grupo Antonio Contreras and became XEMAS-AM.

References

1948 establishments in Mexico
Radio stations established in 1948
Radio stations in Guanajuato
Regional Mexican radio stations
Spanish-language radio stations